is a Japanese television drama, broadcast from January 2017 to March 2017 on the TBS television network. It stars Takako Matsu, Hikari Mitsushima, Issei Takahashi, and Ryuhei Matsuda.

Synopsis
4 musicians meet at a karaoke bar in Tokyo and decide to form a quartet.  They move into a house in Karuizawa to rehearse and perform at the local Nocturne restaurant & music hall.

Cast
Takako Matsu as Maki Maki - 1st violin, husband disappeared a year earlier
Hikari Mitsushima as Suzume Sebuki - cellist with mysterious past
Issey Takahashi as Yutaka Iemori - violist
Ryuhei Matsuda as Tsukasa Beppu - 2nd violin, grandfather owns the house they are living in.
Riho Yoshioka as Alice Kisugi - waitress at Nocturne restaurant & music hall
Takeshi Tomizawa as Daijiro Tanimura - chef at Nocturne restaurant & music hall
 Akiko Yagi as Takami Tanimura	- manager of Nocturne restaurant & music hall
 Mummy-D	as Atsushi Handa	
 Masako Motai as Kyoko Maki - Maki Maki's mother-in-law who thinks Maki Maki killed her son and hires Suzume to spy on her.

Awards

References

External links
 

Japanese romance television series
Thriller television series
2017 Japanese television series debuts
2017 Japanese television series endings
Works about music and musicians
Television shows written by Yûji Sakamoto